The Real Damage is the second EP by UK singer-songwriter Frank Turner. It was released via Xtra Mile Recordings on 7 May 2007 and features all newly recorded songs with exception of the title track.

The inner sleeve of the EP features a 'memorial' to Frank's old acoustic guitar that was stolen in Porvoo, Finland in February 2007. Frank wrote that the instrument was "the guitar I'd had for seven years, with which I'd played every solo show, on which I wrote and recorded every solo song".

Track listing

2007 EPs
Frank Turner albums